1905 was the fifth year for the Detroit Tigers in the American League. The team finished in third place with a record of 79–74 (.516), 15 games behind the Philadelphia Athletics.

Regular season 
The 1905 Tigers were outscored by their opponents 602 to 512, the largest negative run differential ever for a Major League team with a winning record. The team's attendance at Bennett Park was 193,384, eighth out of the eight teams in the AL.

Season standings

Record vs. opponents

Notable transactions 
 August 24, 1905: Ty Cobb was purchased by the Tigers from the Augusta Tourists.

Roster

Player stats

Batting

Starters by position 
Note: Pos = Position; G = Games played; AB = At bats; H = Hits; Avg. = Batting average; HR = Home runs; RBI = Runs batted in

Other batters 
Note: G = Games played; AB = At bats; H = Hits; Avg. = Batting average; HR = Home runs; RBI = Runs batted in

Note: pitchers' batting statistics not included

Pitching

Starting pitchers 
Note: G = Games pitched; IP = Innings pitched; W = Wins; L = Losses; ERA = Earned run average; SO = Strikeouts

Other pitchers 
Note: G = Games pitched; IP = Innings pitched; W = Wins; L = Losses; ERA = Earned run average; SO = Strikeouts

Relief pitchers 
Note: G = Games pitched; W = Wins; L = Losses; SV = Saves; ERA = Earned run average; SO = Strikeouts

Awards and honors

League top five finishers 
Ty Cobb
 Youngest player in the AL (18)

Ed Killian
 AL leader in shutouts (8)
 #3 in AL in wins (23)
 #3 in AL in bases on balls allowed (107)
 #4 in AL in complete games (33)
 #4 in AL in hit batsmen (13)
 #5 in AL in games started (37)

Frank Kitson
 #5 in AL in earned runs allowed (87)

Sam Crawford
 #2 in AL in OPS (.786)
 #2 in AL in doubles (38)
 #2 in AL in runs created (87)
 #2 in AL in extra base hits (54)
 #3 in AL in slugging percentage (.430)
 #3 in AL in hits (171)
 #3 in AL in total bases (247)
 #3 in AL in home runs (6)
 #3 in AL in times on base (224)
 #4 in AL in on-base percentage (.357)
 #4 in AL in RBIs (75)
 #4 in AL in Power/Speed Number (9.4)
 #5 in AL in batting average (.297)

Bill Donovan
 #4 in AL in bases on balls allowed (101)

Bobby Lowe
 2nd oldest player in the AL (39)

George Mullin
 AL leader in complete games (35)
 AL leader in innings pitched (347)
 AL leader in games started (41)
 AL leader in bases on balls allowed (138)
 AL leader in hits allowed (303)
 AL leader in batters faced (1473)
 #2 in AL in games (44)
 #3 in AL in earned runs allowed (97)
 #4 in AL in losses (21)

Bob Wood
 3rd oldest player in AL (39)

Notes

References 

 1905 Detroit Tigers Regular Season Statistics at Baseball Reference

Detroit Tigers seasons
Detroit Tigers season
Detroit Tigers
1905 in Detroit